The Ecumenical Plötzensee Days are an annual event, commemorating martyrs and victims of National Socialism. They take place at the catholic commemoration church Maria Regina Martyrum and at the Protestant Church of Plötzensee. 

The events take place around January 23, Helmuth James Graf von Moltke’s day of death, and January 27, the International Holocaust Remembrance Day. Besides cultural programs as performances of opera, concerts or theater, lectures and vespers are fixed parts in the calendar of events.

Clarita von Trott zu Solz, Rosemarie Reichwein (1992), Bishop Albrecht Schönherr (1996), Friedrich-Wilhelm Marquardt (1998), Jizchak Schwersenz (1999), Günter Brakelmann (2009) and Andreas Maislinger have been lecturing or preaching among others.

Topics
1992: The Kreisau Circle and its meaning today
1993: Renate Wind: „Dem Rad in die Speichen fallen“ – Dietrich Bonhoeffer
1994: Friedrich Georgi: „Wir haben das Letzte gewagt“; Wörmann: „Widerstand in Charlottenburg“
1995: Helmuth James Graf von Moltke’s 50th anniversary of death
1996: Dietrich Bonhoeffer and the preaching seminar in Finkenwalde
1997: Sigrid Jacobeit: Ravensbrück
1998: Being Christian after Auschwitz
1999: Jizchak Schwersenz
2000: Hans Krasa: Brundibár
2002: Ecumenical Vespers
2003: Harald Poelchau
2005: "60 years later"
2006: Dietrich Bonhoeffer’s 100th birthday
2007: "Mother Marija Skobtsova – Martyr of Ravensbrück"
2008: "Locations of audacity" („Silent heroes")
2009: Helmuth James von Moltke – in the land of godless people.
2010: Franz Jägerstätter

External links 
 homepage of the Evangelical church at Charlottenburg North
 press release of the Evangelical church Berlin-Brandenburg 
 press release of the Catholic church Berlin

Catholic–Protestant ecumenism
Holocaust commemoration